Caroline Parmentier (born December 16, 1965, in  Basses-Pyrénées) is a French journalist, editor, public commentator and politician.

She is a member of the National Rally and in 2022 was elected as a Member of the National Assembly for Pas-de-Calais's 9th constituency.

Biography

Early life and journalism career
Parmentier was born on December 16, 1965, in Basses-Pyrénées and grew up in Pau. After leaving school, she joined Présent newspaper under the direction of Jean Madiran. She was a trainee reporter but rose through the ranks of the paper to become its editor in chief. She authored a book with her perspectives on the journalism industry in 1996. In 2014, she became a presenter and commentator on the show Bistro Libertés on TV Libertés.

During her career at Présent, Parmentier was sometimes known for her forthright opinions on certain issues. She has written against abortion and has argued that the French government have sought to replace French nationals with migrants due to declining birthrates and the rise of abortion in France.  In 1995, she was sentenced by the Paris Criminal Court for “racial public defamation” following an article she had written.

Political career
Parmentier suspended her journalism career in 2018 to support Marine Le Pen's campaigns. During the 2019 European Parliament election she acted as Jordan Bardella's campaign coordinator and media strategist.

For the 2022 French legislative election, she contested Pas-de-Calais's 9th constituency in the National Assembly and won the seat in second round defeating incumbent Marguerite Deprez-Audebert. She has also been a regional councilor in Île-de-France since 2021.

See also 

 List of deputies of the 16th National Assembly of France

References 

1965 births
Living people
Deputies of the 16th National Assembly of the French Fifth Republic
21st-century French politicians
21st-century French women politicians
Women members of the National Assembly (France)
National Rally (France) politicians
French journalists
French newspaper editors
French television presenters